Colo High School is a government-funded co-educational comprehensive secondary day school, located on the Bells Line of Road in , on the north-western outskirts of Sydney, New South Wales, Australia.

Established in 1978, the school caters for approximately 1,000 students enrolled at the school from Year 7 to Year 12; and the school is operated by the New South Wales Department of Education.

History
Colo High School was established in 1978 in demountable buildings at North Richmond. The current permanent site was occupied in 1980. The blue and white colours were chosen to match colours selected by the Uniform Committee. Sam Weller, the school's first Deputy Principal, suggested using the school building plan as a basis for the logo. David Stone, founding Mathematics teacher, drew up the design which was accepted as the school badge. The shape also represents the Tree Of Knowledge, and its three sections, Students, Staff and the Community.

Classrooms

There's a main office, administration, common room, library, hall, canteen, senior study, 4 home economics classrooms, 2 music classrooms, 1 gym, 5 visual art classrooms, 2 dark rooms, 7 industrial arts classrooms, 2 agriculture classrooms, 9 math classrooms, 8 science classrooms, 4 language classrooms, 4 social science classrooms, 8 English classrooms, 4 history classrooms and 2 drama.

See also 

 List of government schools in New South Wales
 Education in Australia

References

External links 

Public high schools in Sydney
City of Hawkesbury
Educational institutions established in 1978
1978 establishments in Australia
School buildings completed in 1978